The quarter eagle was a gold coin issued by the United States with a value of two hundred and fifty cents, or two dollars and fifty cents. It was given its name in the Coinage Act of 1792, as a derivation from the US ten-dollar eagle coin.

History

The quarter eagle denomination was struck at the main mint at Philadelphia (1796–1929), and branch mints in Charlotte (1838–1860), New Orleans (1839–1857 only), Dahlonega (1839–1859), San Francisco (1854–1879), and Denver (1911–1925). Years were skipped at the various mints, with no coins at all made between 1808 and 1821 and 1915 and 1925. The first issues weighed 67.5 grains, fineness .9167, until the weight was modified to 64.5 grains and the fineness changed to .8992 by the Act of June 28, 1834. The Coinage Act of 1837 (January 18, 1837) established a fineness of .900. This means that 1837 and later quarter eagles contain 0.121 Troy Oz. of gold content.

Relatively few coins were struck prior to 1834, owing to their higher gold content (promoting melting for their bullion content). The first issues were struck in 1796. The quarter eagle denomination was officially discontinued in 1933 with the removal of the United States from the Gold Standard, although the last date of issue was 1929.

List of design varieties

Capped Bust
Also known as the "Turban Head", this interpretation of Liberty wearing a turban-like cap was designed by Robert Scot and was minted from 1796 to 1807, for a total of less than 20,000 coins minted. 

There were three varieties of this design. First came the Capped Bust facing right variety. There were two variations of this design, no stars on the obverse, and stars on the obverse. The 'no stars' variety was produced only in 1796, replaced with the stars. In 1808, Liberty was redesigned by John Reich, to be wearing more of a traditional cap rather than a turban. This design was minted for 1808 only, but in 1821 the mint reinstated the quarter eagle and it was produced again until 1827, slightly scaled down to 18.5 millimeters from the original 20. In 1829, the quarter eagle was reduced in size again to 18.2 mm, and featured smaller letters and stars. This version of the design was produced until 1834.

Classic Head

The "Classic Head" variety was designed by William Kneass, which featured a traditional maiden with a ribbon binding her long, curly hair. This variety omitted E pluribus unum from the reverse of the coin. In 1840, a coronet and smaller head were designed to conform with the appearance of the larger gold coins, therefore making the Classic Head design obsolete.

The Classic Head design was produced from 1834 to 1839.

Liberty Head

Also known as the "Coronet Head", the Liberty head was designed to match the styles of the other gold eagles the government was producing. The Liberty Head design was created by Christian Gobrecht and was produced successfully from 1840 to 1907, the most popular of all of the models. Like its predecessor, this variety omitted E Pluribus Unum from the reverse.

One notable date is 1848, when 230 ounces of gold were sent to the Secretary of War Marcy by Colonel R.B. Mason, the military governor of California. The gold was turned over to the mint and promptly made into quarter eagles. The distinguishing mark CAL. was punched above the heraldic eagle on the reverse side of the coin. Only 1,389 of these coins were minted and are highly sought after by collectors. There are several specimens with proof-like surfaces and the coins are highly sought after by collectors, often fetching prices from  if in good enough condition.

Indian Head

The "Indian Head" design and the similar half eagle piece were created by Boston sculptor Bela Lyon Pratt. The coin was a departure from other examples of American coinage because it had no raised edges, instead featuring a design sunk into the planchet. Unfortunately, the public had much distaste for the experimental and unusual design. Many feared that the recessed surfaces would collect germs, and others simply thought it was ugly. Numismatists took little interest in the coin. This resulted in few examples in uncirculated condition and the coin slipped into obscurity for many years. Today, however, collectors adore the exotic design and the coin is recognized as part of the creative renaissance of American coinage. The Indian Head design was produced from 1908 to 1929.  For sale to collectors it has been frequently counterfeited, so buying uncertified coins can be risky.

Commemorative issues
Two of the early United States commemorative coins are quarter eagles. The 1915-S was produced for the Panama-Pacific Exposition in San Francisco. The obverse depicts Liberty riding a hippocampus, while the reverse shows an eagle. With only 6,749 sold it is quite valuable. Considerably more common is the 1926 issue struck to commemorate the Sesquicentennial Exposition in Philadelphia. A total of 46,019 pieces were sold. The obverse shows Liberty standing on a globe and holding a torch and the United States Declaration of Independence, while the reverse pictures Independence Hall. Since the resumption of commemorative gold coin mintage in 1984 none have been struck in this denomination.

References

External links

US Quarter Eagle by year and type. Histories, photos, and more.
1915-S PANAMA-PACIFIC COMMEMORATIVE QUARTER EAGLE ($2.50)
1926 SESQUICENTENNIAL QUARTER EAGLE ($2.50)

1796 introductions
United States gold coins
 
Goddess of Liberty on coins
Eagles on coins